is a former Japanese football player and manager. He played for Japan national team He is the current chairman of Iwate Grulla Morioka.

Club career
Akita is a strong and physical centre-back, who is also arguably one of the best headers of the ball within the J1 League. One of the best defenders of his generation and a 10-year stalwart for the Kashima Antlers since 1993, Akita left Kashima in early 2004 to move back to his native Nagoya, signing for hometown team Nagoya Grampus Eight. He moved to J2 League side Kyoto Sanga FC at the beginning of the 2007 season. In November 2007, he announced his retirement from the game. Akita won the champions J1 League 4 times, J.League Cup 3 times and Emperor's Cup 2 times at Kashima Antlers. He was selected Best Eleven 4 times.

International career
On 24 October 1995, Akita debuted for Japan national team against Saudi Arabia. He played at 1996 Asian Cup. He became a regular from the middle of 1997 and at 1998 World Cup qualification in 1997, Japan won the qualify for 1998 World Cup first time Japan's history. He played at 1998 World Cup and 1999 Copa América. He played full-time in all matches at both competitions. In 2002, he was selected Japan for the first time in 3 years. He was also selected Japan for 2002 World Cup, but he did not play in the match. After 2002 World Cup, he became a regular player again under new manager Zico. On 8 June 2003, the match against Argentina is his last game for Japan. Although he was a member of Japan for 2003 Confederations Cup in June, he did not play in the match. He played 44 games and scored 4 goals for Japan until 2003.

Coaching career
After retirement, Akita started coaching career at Kyoto Sanga FC in 2008. In July 2010, he became a manager as Hisashi Kato successor. However the club was relegated to J2 League and he resigned end of the season. He signed with Tokyo Verdy in 2012. In November, he resigned and became a manager for FC Machida Zelvia. He was sacked in June 2013.

Career statistics

Club

International

Scores and results list Japan's goal tally first, score column indicates score after each Akita goal.

Managerial statistics

Honors
 J1 League: 1996, 1998, 2000, 2002
 J.League Cup: 1997, 2000, 2002
 Emperor's Cup: 1997, 2000

Individual
 J1 League Best Eleven: 1997, 1998, 2000, 2001
 Selected to AFC All Star Team: 1998

References

External links
 
 
 Japan National Football Team Database
 
 

1970 births
Living people
Aichi Gakuin University alumni
Association football people from Aichi Prefecture
Japanese footballers
Japan international footballers
J1 League players
J2 League players
Kashima Antlers players
Nagoya Grampus players
Kyoto Sanga FC players
1996 AFC Asian Cup players
1998 FIFA World Cup players
1999 Copa América players
2002 FIFA World Cup players
2003 FIFA Confederations Cup players
Japanese football managers
J1 League managers
J2 League managers
J3 League managers
Kyoto Sanga FC managers
FC Machida Zelvia managers
Iwate Grulla Morioka managers
Association football defenders
Footballers at the 1994 Asian Games
Asian Games competitors for Japan